Aruru may refer to:
Aruru, a Mesopotamian goddess of vegetation at some point conflated with Ninhursag
Aruru (Keroro Land), a character in the anime and manga Sgt. Frog
Aruruu, a character in the Japanese visual novel Utawarerumono